Pierluigi Ronzon (born 7 March 1934) is a former Italian football player from Gemona del Friuli in the Province of Udine. He played club football as a midfielder or defender for some of the top clubs in his country, including Sampdoria, Napoli, Lazio, Atalanta and A.C. Milan.

At international level, he represented Italy on one occasion, in a game played on 13 March 1960. Notably, for Napoli he scored the match-winning goal of the 1961–62 Coppa Italia final against Spal 1907; this was the first time a club from Serie B had won the cup.

Honours 
Atalanta
 Serie B: 1958–59

Napoli
 Coppa Italia: 1961–62
 Coppa delle Alpi: 1966

References 

1934 births
Living people
Italian footballers
Italy international footballers
Serie A players
Serie B players
S.S.C. Napoli players
A.C. Milan players
U.C. Sampdoria players
Atalanta B.C. players
S.S. Lazio players
People from Gemona del Friuli
Association football defenders
Association football midfielders
Footballers from Friuli Venezia Giulia